Lt. Col W.G. (Billy) Barker, VC Airport or Dauphin (Lt. Col W.G. (Billy) Barker, VC) Airport , formerly the Dauphin Regional Airport, is located  south of Dauphin, Manitoba, Canada. It is named after the top Canadian fighter ace in WW I William George Barker.

The airport was established as RCAF Station Dauphin as part of the British Commonwealth Air Training Plan.

References

External links
 Page about this airport on COPA's Places to Fly airport directory.

Certified airports in Manitoba
Dauphin
Dauphin, Manitoba